Orlando International Premium Outlets (formerly Prime Outlets-Orlando) is an outdoor outlet mall in Orlando, Florida, United States along the northern end of International Drive.

Description 

Originally, the complex was named "Belz Factory Outlet World" and included 175 stores in two indoor malls, four annexes and an outdoor designer outlet center when it opened in 1990. In Summer 2005, Prime Retail, who owns four other outlet malls in Florida, acquired the center and named it "Prime Outlets-Orlando".  In September 2007, The mall reopened after a multimillion-dollar remodel into an open air lifestyle center and was again renamed as Prime Outlets-International for the road the mall is located on.  In April 2008, the last phase of redevelopment opened with over 40 stores between Neiman Marcus Last Call and the Food Court.

In late August 2010, the center was acquired by Simon Property Group's Premium Outlet sector along with the majority of the Prime Outlet centers and was renamed Orlando Premium Outlets-International Drive in September 2010. The center is now sister malls to its main outlet rival, Orlando Premium Outlets-Vineland Avenue, which opened in 2000.

The outlets are serviced by Lynx buses (links) 8, 24, and 42.

Stores 

The sprawling complex has two components, the main center and its separate Outlet Marketplace Center with 20 stores.  There are over 180 stores at Orlando Premium Outlets-International Drive.

Anchors 

 Old Navy
 Nike Factory Store 
 Reebok 
 Saks Fifth Avenue Off Fifth
 Victoria's Secret Factory Store

References

External links 

 Orlando Premium Outlets-International Official Website

Buildings and structures in Orlando, Florida
Premium Outlets
Shopping malls in Florida
Tourist attractions in Orlando, Florida
Shopping malls established in 2000
Outlet malls in the United States
2000 establishments in Florida